Preston Theodore King (born March 3, 1936) is an American academic and African-American civil rights activist. He taught extensively in universities in the United Kingdom, nations of Africa, Australia and, finally, the United States.

In 1961 King moved to exile in the United Kingdom after having done graduate work there. He was resisting racism by the local draft board in his hometown of Albany, Georgia, during the Jim Crow years. He did not return to the United States until receiving a presidential pardon from Bill Clinton in 2000.

Biography 
King was born in Albany, Georgia, the youngest of seven sons of Margaret (née Slater) and Clennon Washington King Sr., both of whom graduated from Tuskegee Institute. Preston's elder brothers included Chevene Bowers King, Clennon Washington King Jr., and Slater King.

After attending local schools, King studied at the London School of Economics in the late 1950s, and at the University of Maryland in 1961. After his draft board learned that he was African American, it addressed him as "Preston" rather than using "Mr." He refused to respond. Accused of draft evasion, King went into exile in the United Kingdom to avoid imprisonment and because he thought the charges unjust. He taught alternately in England and Africa, at Keele University, the University of Ghana, the University of Sheffield, the University of East Africa, and the University of Nairobi (where he was department chair).

In 1976 King moved to the University of New South Wales in Australia, becoming head of his school. In 1986 he returned to the UK, to Lancaster University, where he again chaired his department.

After much resistance in Georgia, he was pardoned by President Bill Clinton in 2000. He had been unable to return to the US for the funeral of his father or of two brothers.

Following his return to the United States from exile after his presidential pardon in 2000, King taught at Emory University and Morehouse College in Atlanta. He has also held numerous visiting positions.

Personal life
King married British Jewish social justice activist Murreil Hazel Stern, sister of physician Miriam Stoppard, in 1963. Their daughter Oona King (born 1967) is a Labour party politician and former Member of Parliament. She is known as Baroness King of Bow.

Selected bibliography

Books

References

External links
Georgiaencyclopedia.org 
Answers.com

1936 births
Living people
Activists for African-American civil rights
American expatriate academics
Alumni of the London School of Economics
University of Maryland, College Park alumni
Academic staff of the University of Ghana
Academics of the University of East Anglia
Academics of the University of Sheffield
Academics of Lancaster University
Emory University faculty
Morehouse College faculty
People from Albany, Georgia
Recipients of American presidential pardons